Manak Nagar railway station is a small railway station in Lucknow, Uttar Pradesh. Its code is MKG. It serves Lucknow city. The station consists of three platforms. The platforms are not well sheltered.

Manak Nagar is one of the local stations in Lucknow and lies on Lucknow–Kanpur Suburban Railway.

MEMU services

Major trains

Some of the important trains that runs from Manak Nagar are :

 Chitrakoot Express
 Lucknow–Jhansi Passenger
 Lucknow Junction–Kasganj Passenger
 Kasganj–Lucknow Jn. Passenger
 Kanpur–Lucknow MEMU
 Lucknow–Kanpur MEMU
 Kanpur Central–Barabanki MEMU
 Panki–Kanpur–Lucknow Jn. MEMU

References

Railway stations in Lucknow
Lucknow NR railway division